Akola (Wasud) is a small village in Sangole taluka, Solapur district, (Maharashtra), India.

References

External links
Sardar Shamrao Ligade vidyalaya and Jr. College, Akola

Villages in Solapur district